Raymond Fellows (1885 – September 3, 1957), of Bucksport, Maine, was a justice of the Maine Supreme Judicial Court from May 1, 1946, to September 15, 1956, serving as chief justice from April 7, 1954, to September 15, 1956.

Fellows graduated from the University of Maine School of Law in 1909. His father, Oscar F. Fellows, represented his hometown of Bucksport in the Maine House of Representatives and served as its speaker from 1903 to 1904. His younger brother, Frank, represented Maine's third congressional district in the U.S. House of Representatives from 1941 to 1957.

From 1925 to 1928, Fellows served as Maine Attorney General during the administration of Governor Owen Brewster. Fellows chaired the Republican State Committee in 1932, and was appointed to the state supreme court by Governor Horace Hildreth in 1946, and elevated to Chief Justice by Governor Burton M. Cross in 1954.

Fellows married Madge Gilmore, with whom he had two daughters and a son. Fellows died in a hospital in Bangor, Maine, at the age of 71, just two weeks after the death of his former colleague Percy T. CLarke.

References

1885 births
1957 deaths
People from Bucksport, Maine
Justices of the Maine Supreme Judicial Court
Maine Attorneys General
University of Maine School of Law alumni
20th-century American judges